Antoni Kindler (born May 16, 1988) is a Canadian field hockey player, in the goalkeeper position. Kindler has competed internationally for Canada since 2011.  Kindler resides in Vancouver, British Columbia.

Career 
Kindler competed for Canada at the 2011 Pan American Games in Guadalajara. The team finished with the silver medal. In 2018, Kindler competed for Canada at the 2018 Commonwealth Games in the Gold Coast, Australia. The team finished in 8th.

Olympics
Kindler has been selected to represent Canada at the 2020 Summer Olympics.

References

External links
 
 Antoni Kindler at Field Hockey Canada
 
 
 
 

Living people
1988 births
Canadian male field hockey players
Pan American Games silver medalists for Canada
Pan American Games medalists in field hockey
Commonwealth Games competitors for Canada
Field hockey players at the 2010 Commonwealth Games
Field hockey players at the 2011 Pan American Games
Field hockey players at the 2018 Commonwealth Games
Field hockey players at the 2020 Summer Olympics
Olympic field hockey players of Canada
People from Urbana, Illinois
Medalists at the 2011 Pan American Games
Male field hockey goalkeepers